Joypurhat Girls' Cadet College is a Military high school for girls, located in Joypurhat District, Bangladesh. Cadet colleges are autonomous residential institutions that impart an all round education to the young learners at the secondary and higher secondary level. The colleges are under the auspices of the Ministry of Defence and function under the direct supervision of the Adjutant General of the Bangladesh Army. Joypurhat Girls' Cadet College is one of three girls' cadet colleges and nine boys cadet colleges in Bangladesh. It is the newest of all the cadet colleges. The college occupies  of land and has capacity for 375 students. It is the fifth largest cadet college in Bangladesh & the biggest one among the Girls' Cadet College in Bangladesh. It is renowned for its quality of education provided in all sectors of human necessity. Like other cadet colleges it follows the national curriculum prescribed by the National Curriculum and Textbook Board (NCTB) and gives emphasis to extracurricular and co-curricular activities.

History
On the basis of Ecnec approval, the abandoned cement Factory of Ministry of Mineral Resources in Joypurhat District was turned into a Girls’ Cadet College. The project area was on the western side with case on 2 JC/70, LA. The total area of the land was of 57 acres. The process of turning a part of the cement factory into a Cadet College started in the year, 2004.

The foundation stone of the college was established by the then Prime Minister on 29 March 2005.

Some other parts of the Cement Factory were given to Science and Technology Institute and the remaining parts are situated in 200 Meter far from the present Joypurhat Girls’ Cadet College.

The college started its activities in April 2006 under the immediate implementation of projects of the then Prime Minister. The institution gave admissions to 50 Cadets in class Seven and 50 Cadets in class Eight for that year.

"SHIKKHAI PROGOTI" or Education is progress keeping the College motto in mind, Joypurhat Girls' Cadet College started her journey on 16 July 2006. This year 55 cadets have got themselves admitted into this college. Here Cadets are given general education and elementary military training by highly qualified and well experienced teachers and military personnels.

Demonym
The cadets of Joypurhat Girls' Cadet College are known as the Joypurians / JGCC'an.

Admission
Students are admitted in class VII (7th Grade) at the ages 11 to 14 years. The selection process is rigorous, with a written exam, viva and medical tests. The selected top 55 students will study until class XII (Higher Secondary).

Cadet college is a fully residential school. Cadets get four vacations of total 90 days in a year called term break.

Administration

Central administration
Cadet Colleges function under the Ministry of Defence. The Defence Secretary is the chairman of the Cadet College Governing Council while the Adjutant General, Bangladesh Army is the chairman of the Cadet College Governing Body. The Cadet College Section at the Adjutant General's Branch at Army Headquarters directly controls all the Cadet Colleges.

College administration
The principal of the college may be either a serving military officer of the army rank of Lieutenant Colonel, or navy or air force equivalent, or a senior officer from the Cadet College Service (promoted from the faculty members as per regulation). The vice principal is responsible for academic affairs.

A military officer of the rank of major is posted as the adjutant who is the principal's assistant and is responsible for administrative matters. Senior faculty members appointed as a House Master look after the administration of the Cadet Hostel/ Boarding House. All faculty members are attached to a Houses and are called House Tutors. The accounts officer looks after the matters relating to accounts and budget.

Cadet administration
To build leadership skills and maintain effective cadet administration a set of cadet leaders called Prefects are appointed from the cadets of the most senior class after departure of a batch. They are inaugurated by College Principal, Adjutant and Vice Principal in the college auditorium. The cadet administration works under the supervision of the college administration. According to seniority the appointments are:
 College Prefect (leads 375 cadets, maintains the overall discipline and works as a bridge between cadets and the administrative board)
 3 House Prefects (leads each of the house of 125 cadets)
 College Games Prefect (in charge of the college games)
 College Cultural Prefect (in charge of cultural affairs)
 College Dining Hall and Mosque Prefect (in charge of dining and mosque discipline matters)
 3 Assistant House Prefects (assists each of the house prefects)
 3 House Games Prefects
 3 House Cultural Prefects
 Junior Prefects (from class XI, to assist the Prefects named above)

Academic System
Cadets are enrolled in class 7 of Bangladesh National Curriculum and continue their study for six years up to the end of higher secondary or college level (high school in international standard). They follow the English version syllabus of the National Curriculum and Textbook Board. Three major exams are taken here, once at class 8, named Junior School Certificate (JSC), once in class 10, named Secondary School Certificate (SSC) and Higher Secondary Certificate (HSC) is the final examination to pass in class 12.

Each class generally has fifty five students on an average, divided into two groups (called forms) under the supervision of a Form Master. The Form Master is assisted by a Form Leader selected from the cadets of that form. The JSC, SSC and HSC examinations are administered under direct control of the Board of Education of Rajshahi Division. The college holds regular internal examinations to assess progress and to prepare the cadets for the Board Examinations.

The parents/guardians are regularly informed of a girls' academic performance and attitude. Additional classes are arranged for struggling students. However, a student showing consistent poor performance will be withdrawn from the college. All the examination dates are published in the Academic Calendar at the beginning of the academic year. A calendar year is usually divided into three terms. The medium of instruction is English. Special emphasis is given in Communicative English, Religious Studies, General Knowledge and Current Affairs. Cadets of Joypurhat Girls' Cadet College have shown a clear trend of securing top positions in board examinations each year.

Faculty and staff

Departments

 Physics
 Chemistry
 Biology

 Mathematics
 Bengali
 English

 Economics
 Civics
 History

 Islamic Studies
 Arts and crafts
 Geography
 ICT

In accordance with the National Education Policy, Joypurhat Girls' Cadet College offers only the science and humanities educational sections for the cadets from the 9th grade. However, the cadets are encouraged to study science.

The Vice Principal is in charge of the Academic Section and the faculty. The faculty comprises two academic departments - Science and Humanities:
 Humanities: English, Bangla, Religious Studies, Civics, Economics, Geography, History, Arts and Crafts and Home Economics.
 Science: Mathematics, Physics, Chemistry, Biology, Statistics and Computer Science.

In addition, the senior most faculty member of each subject heads the department and supervises the curriculum of the respective subjects. Physical training, drill and musical band lessons are supervised by their respective instructors from the army (noncommissioned officers, usually corporal or sergeant).

Houses 

Usually, each house has 125 students, 17 to 18 from each grade. Cadets are divided into houses on their initial intake year. Each house is supervised by a House Master, an Assistant House Master and twelve House Tutors. Each house has seven latest computers with hi-speed internet WIFI connection. The facilities of washing; ironing & cleaning are available to all the cadets. There is a recreation room in each house which allows the cadets to enjoy movie show in a wide screen with home theatre system. Besides, there is an indoor games room in each house which comprises pool-table, dart board, table-tennis board, foosball and carom. Each house is given a symbol, colour and a motto. The epaulettes worn by the cadets signifies their house through their colors. Year-round extra and co-curricular competitions and activities are arranged in broad category of cultural, sports and gardening competitions, as well as in academics. Based on results from each competitions, the houses earn 'points' and the highest scoring house in a year is announced a winner at the end of the year. The winner house is awarded an Overall Championship trophy at the end of the year. These competitions develop not only individual qualities like Sportsmanship, Public Speaking, Leadership and others but also teach them Teamwork and Cooperation as the cadets have to go through each competition as a member of the house. This enhances the competition and development for all the cadets.

College events
Being a boarding school, the cadets stay on campus 24 hours a day. The college can accommodate 375 cadets in total.

The academic year of the college is marked by many different events and Inter-House Competitions. The events encourage confidence and sportsmanship within the cadets. All the various competitions - Academic, Co-Curricular and Extra-Curricular - award house points which go towards the overall Championship Trophy of the year, which is greatly cherished and honoured. This is hotly contested. The notable events of the college are:

College Stage Competition (CSC)
 Qirat Competition
 Extempore Speech Competition(Bengali and English)
 Story Telling Competition
 Debate (Bengali and English)
 Solo Acting Competition (Bengali and English)
 Parliamentary Debate (English)
 Music Competition
 Dance Competition
 Current Affairs Display Competition
 Recitation (Bangla and English)
 General Knowledge and Quiz Competition
 Spelling Competition (Bangla and English)
 Painting Competition
 Model United Nation Competition

Hobbies clubs/societies
 Quranic Society
 Physics Club
 Chemistry Club
 Biology Club
 Geography and Environment Club
 Arts and Crafts Club
 Current Affairs Club
 Bengali Literary and Cultural Society
 English Literary and Cultural Society
 Music and Dance Club
 First Aid, Health & Hygiene Club
 Computer Club
 Sewing and Cooking Club
 Photography Club
 Mathematics Club
 Drama Society

Games and physical activities 
Every academic day (Saturday through Thursday) begins with either Physical Training or Drill (military parade) period of 30 mins. Cadets also take part in various games and sports in the afternoon (Saturday through Wednesday) for 50 mins. The college has facilities for handball, volleyball, badminton, cricket and athletics. Annual inter-house competitions are organised in following games and sports:
 Handball (senior and junior group)
 Badminton (senior and junior group)
 Basket Ball (senior and junior group)
 Athletics (senior, intermediate and junior group)
 PT Display (combined)
The schedule of the competitions is circulated through the Calendar of Events at the beginning of the year. The Annual Athletic Competition is the final competition of the year and is held after the end of year examinations. It ends with a grand prize-giving ceremony to which the parents/guardians are invited.

Other competitions 
 Inter-house Academic Competition (based on the academic performance of the cadets)
 Inter-house Novices' Drill Competition
 Principal's Inspection Parade
 Health and Hygiene Competition
 Principal's House Inspection
 Inter-house Drill Competition
 Inter-house Indoor Games Competition
 Discipline Competition

Educational visits, excursions and picnic
Educational visits and excursions are arranged regularly.

Commemoration of national days and special occasions 
National Days are observed. Victory Day (16 December) and Independence Day (26 March) start with Flag Raising Ceremony early in the morning. International Mother Language Day (21 February) starts with an early morning procession. Special cultural programs and discussions are organised highlighting the significance of the day. Special Days like Shob i Barat, Eid I Miladun Nabi are observed with special prayer and milad mahfil. College Raising Day is also observed with due enthusiasm.

Parents visiting day and communication with family
The students are permitted to receive visitors once a month on scheduled Fridays during the term. The visit dates are communicated to the parents at the beginning of the year. Cadets can also make phone call to their parents as per a schedule. Letter writing home is compulsory every Friday.

Recreation 
Every House has a recreation room with a TV, newspapers, magazines and musical instruments. The House indoor games room has provision for table tennis, carrom, chess and scrabble. Cadets can also pass their time reading books in the House library. On selected Thursdays movie showings are arranged.

Wall Magazine and periodicals
The bilingual Bengali and English 'Wall Magazine' is published regularly as part of inter-house competition. Yearly Bengali and English periodicals named ANKUR and LUSTRE are also published where the cadets can express their mind on varied subjects.

Cultural activities 
Cadets are encouraged to participate in cultural activities. Every class presents a cultural night where the officers and faculty members are invited along with family. Houses also present a cultural programme at the end of each term. Music and dance lessons are organised for interested cadets. The creative potential of a novice cadet is discovered through a Talent Show programme. Special occasions (Bengali New Year, Rabindra, Nazrul anniversary etc.) are celebrated through cultural shows and discussion.

Inter Cadet College, National & International competitions
Cadet Colleges have always been a great podium for the cadets to groom themselves up in the best manner and for a better future. Among the 12 cadet colleges in Bangladesh, Joypurhat Girls' Cadet College has constantly earned fame. The history of JGCC upholds the pride it bears in the arena of sports & culture.

The team of JGCC has always been one of the finest and leading squads in the Inter Girls' Cadet College Sports Meet. It has conquered the replica in Inter-Girls' Cadet College Sports Meet (IGCCSM) as the manifest of its superiority by becoming Champions thrice in a row (2014-2016). 
In 2017, Joypurhat Girls' Cadet College became runner-up in IGCCSM. Moving on to the year 2019, JGCC has successfully become champion in all sectors of IGCCSM.
 
In the Inter Girls' Cadet College Dance Meet (IGCCDM)-2019 JGCC was the only cadet college achieving the glory of being the champion ever since it started. Cadet Dipannita snatched the 1st position in the "CLASSICAL DANCE" category of IGCCDM for consecutive 2 years. 
The splendid Group Dance team of Joypurhat Girls' Cadet College has proven their excellence by being the champion in both IGCCDM-2017 and IGCCDM-19.

Joypurhat Girls' Cadet College participated in the Inter-Cadet College Literary and Music Meet (ICCLMM)- 2018. The cadets of JGCC proved their excellence by acquiring various prizes. Their praiseworthy performance has earned great applause for the incomparability. Joypurhat Girls' Cadet College grabbed the overall 5th position and 3rd position in literature. The mesmerizing performances of the singers made the spectators spellbound. Cadet Saptarshi, Cadet Sadia and Cadet Faizah made us proud by achieving the 3rd position. In essay writing, Cadet Jeba snatched the most awaited 1st position for the college.

Cadet Colleges have a prestigious history in national competitions such as the National TV Debate Competition (in Bengali), the newly introduced National Parliamentary Debate (in English) on Bangladesh Television and other quiz competitions at national level.

In Chintar Chash, the cadets of Joypurhat Girls' Cadet College made extraordinary results by achieving both the National Champion Award and the Divisional Champion Award. The cadets of JGCC have also earned fame with their performances in the BUPMUN. Cadet Sehba achieved the best country delegation award and special mention award for her mesmerizing performance.

Not only within the periphery of Bangladesh, but the cultural aspect of JGCC has also stepped out in the international arena with a promising approach. A mentionable one was the participation of Cadet Sanjida to the 2nd Global Summit on Education (GSE) conducted by GIEST in Adamas University of Kolkata, India. The four cadets from four different cadet colleges (Cadet Sanjida from Joypurhat Girls' Cadet College, Cadet Zim from Feni Girls' Cadet College, Cadet Asib from Barisal Cadet College and Cadet Zubair from Rangpur Cadet College) became champion in Quiz Competition and attained 3rd position in poster presentation among participant students from more than 5 countries. They gained award as the Best Participant Country.

College Library
Library is part and parcel of an educational institution. There is an enriched library in JGCC. The name of the library is "Bir Sreshtho Munshi Abdur Rouf Library". There are more than about 18000 books on various subjects including Bengali, English, Mathematics, religion, Physics, Chemistry, Biology, Geography, History, Computer Science, Islamic History, Statistics, Political Science, Information and Communication Technology (ICT), Arts & Crafts in the library. Besides, there are many journals, magazines, periodicals, Atlases, Dictionaries, Encyclopedias, Annual reports and publications, Survey reports, census reports, country reports, statistical yearbooks, defense related publications and Audio Visual Materials in the library. The cadets are given library cards so that they can borrow books from the library. Both Bengali and English newspapers are kept there. The library opens a vast door of knowledge for the cadets with all the facilities including sufficient light and well ventilation.

College Auditorium
College Auditorium is the place where the cadets' talents come to light. There is a large Auditorium in the ground floor of ‘Bir Shrestho Jahangir’ Academic Building. The name of the Auditorium is Bir Shrestho Mostofa Kamal Auditorium. The Auditorium can accommodate more than 500 people at a time. The Auditorium is well lighted and well ventilated. All kinds of Cultural and Stage programs are nicely presented by the cadets on this Auditorium.

College Hospital
There is a spacious and well-developed hospital in the campus of Joypurhat Girls' Cadet College. The name of the hospital is "Bir Sreshtho Nur Mohammad" Hospital. There are 25 beds for the patients. The hospital is run by a specialized doctor ranked major or captain from the medical corps of Bangladesh Army. Besides cadets, it provides treatment to the employees of all classes along with their families. Other medical staffs are always there to serve treatment for the patients. All types of general treatment as well as medicines are given to the patients here. To guard against epidemics, vaccinations and inoculations are carried out as and when required. The cadets are weighed, measured and medically checked up and a proper health record is maintained of all cadets. The hospital also has an isolation ward for the segregation of patients with infectious diseases.

In case of emergency, the patients are sent to Combined Military Hospital, Bogra. There is also an ambulance for carrying the patients. In case a cadet needs an operation, all out efforts are made to inform the parents or guardians. However, if there is no time to inform them, such students are operated upon without any delay. The parents/guardians of cadets are required to submit a written permission for emergency, lifesaving surgery. In case of an emergency the authority rests with the principal.

Mess
The College Mess is a large spacious dining hall, which can accommodate 375 cadets at a time and has sufficient facilities required for cooking and service of food, stocking of dry and fresh provisions. The mess functions under the supervision of a member of the teaching staff (faculty member). Cadets are also involved in the management of the mess. A committee is presided over by the Vice Principal and includes both the Officer-In-Charge Cadet Mess and cadet representatives. They make every effort to provide a balanced diet with extra food if required in special cases. All incoming food supplies are checked and certified by the Medical Officer before being received. The cadets eat five meals a day in the Mess.

Cadets are not allowed to eat using their hand. The use of forks and spoons is mandatory. On occasion, a formal dinner is arranged (e.g. farewell of an officer or faculty member, end of term dinner or in honour of a special guest visiting the college) where the officers and faculty members are invited to along with their spouses.

The routine meals of the cadets are:
 Breakfast with tea( after morning Physical Training or Parade, at around 7 am)
 Snacks and Milk (at around 10 am, after 4th period)
 Lunch ( after morning lessons, at around 1.15 pm)
 Afternoon tea with snacks (before or after the Magrib prayers depending on the season)
 Dinner ( at around 8 pm, between evening and night preparation classes)

Cadet Canteen (JGCC)
There is a Canteen near the gate of the Houses. The Canteen opens after the games time. There are two assistants to run the Canteen. The cadets purchase their necessary dry food items or other essential items by coupon. On weekends, the Canteen opens in the morning also.

See also
 Cadet Colleges in Bangladesh

References

External links

 Remain alert to conspiracy against edn system – Khaleda Zia on the inauguration ceremony of JGCC.

Military high schools
Educational institutions established in 2006
Girls' schools in Bangladesh
Cadet colleges in Bangladesh
Educational Institutions affiliated with Bangladesh Army
2006 establishments in Bangladesh